Aoa is a monotypic genus of butterflies in the family Pieridae. The genus and its sole species, Aoa affinis, are endemic to Sulawesi.

References

Pierini
Butterflies described in 1865
Butterflies of Indonesia